The UTVA 75 is a compact, low-wing monoplane, piston-engine aircraft manufactured by UTVA. It is mainly used as a military basic trainer and sporting aircraft.

Development
The Utva 75 made its maiden flight in 1976.
Between 1978 and 1985, a total of 136 Utva 75s were produced for the former Yugoslav Air Force. Following the breakup of Yugoslavia, many were passed on to successor states.

Design
Designed in 1975 to replace the UTVA Aero 3 as the primary basic trainer in the Yugoslav Air Force. Utva 75 is low-wing all-metal utility airplane. Wings are cantilever, rectangular with main and aux. wing spar and the integral fuel cells located between them. Dihedral is 6 degrees, NACA65 415 wing section.There is one underwing hardpoint on each wing for dop tanks carriage or additional weapon stores. Landing gear is non-retractable with oleo-pneumatic shock-absorbers. It features upward opening gull-wingtype access doors to the two-seat side-by-side cockpit. Another characteristic is a row of air scoops, presumably for cockpit ventilation, in the central front frame of the cockpit. 
The positions of the throttle and RPM levers are changed, which is leading to confusion, in all western aircraft there is a throttle on the left, and RPM on the right on Utva 75 it is exactly the opposite. The cabin doors have a poorly designed closing system, resulting in many doors shattering due to inadvertent opening in the air. However, the aircraft has one of the better suspension systems and even hard landings will turn out soft.

Operational history
The aircraft was operated in the Yugoslav Air force as a basic trainer and it was given in parallel operational use by aeroclubs for the needs of basic training of reserve officers, maintenance of pilot training in the army reserve, air pick-up of mail with anchor, towing gliders and general aeroclub use. The aircraft has proven to be robust but economically very inefficient, maintenance is very expensive for a two-seater aircraft and also fuel consumption is high. It is estimated that the long-term costs are 150% higher than on the Cessna 152. The aircraft is flying very slowly around 160 km/h with a fuel consumption of around 45 liters per hour. When towing gliders, fuel consumption reaches 55-60 liters per hour.

Variants
UTVA 75A11 Single-seat agricultural aircraft, largely using the Utva 75 airframe.
UTVA-75A21 Two-seater with dual controls and provisions for blind instrument flying.
UTVA-75A41 Four-seater with advanced avionics, first flown in 1986.
SAFAT 03 A development of the UTVA 75 from the SAFAT Aviation Complex at Khartoum, Sudan, with a modified fuselage and tail fin. To confuse matters the Sudanese Government marked up a standard UTVA 75 as a SAFAT 03. One example known, which was displayed at the Dubai Air Show in 2011.

Operators 

Letalski center Maribor Civil operator (1989-today)
 
Sudanese Air Force

Former operators

Yugoslav Air Force → partially handed over for use to aeroclubs
  
Slovenian Air Force → handed over entirely to aeroclubs for use

Croatian Air Force

Air Force and Anti-Aircraft Defence of Bosnia and Herzegovina
 
Serbian Air Force

Montenegrin Air Force

North Macedonia Air Brigade

Specifications (UTVA 75A21)

See also

References

1970s Yugoslav military trainer aircraft
1970s Yugoslav civil trainer aircraft
75
Military Technical Institute Belgrade
Glider tugs
Low-wing aircraft
Single-engined tractor aircraft
Aircraft first flown in 1976